Kasem Bundit University Football Club (Thai สโมสรฟุตบอลมหาวิทยาลัยเกษมบัณฑิต) is a Thailand professional football club under the stewardship of Kasem Bundit University based in Bangkok. The club is currently playing in the Thai League 3 Bangkok metropolitan region.

In the 2009 season they finished as runners up missing promotion to the 2009 play-offs.

Stadium and locations

Season by season record

Players

Current squad

Club staff

See also
 Kasem Bundit University

External links
 KBU FC Facebookpage
 Cheer KBU FC
 Kasem Bundit University 0–1 Rajpracha Division 2 2009

Football clubs in Thailand
Sport in Bangkok
Association football clubs established in 2009
2009 establishments in Thailand